Butano State Park is a state park in the U.S. state of California, showcasing the secluded redwood-filled canyon of Little Butano Creek, a tributary of Butano Creek in the Pescadero Creek watershed. Located in San Mateo County near Pescadero, the  park was established in 1956.

Features
The park features 40 miles of hiking trails, 21 drive-in campsites and 18 walk-in campsites. Restrooms with running water are provided.   Drinking water is available at the park in both the campground and in the day use areas. There are no showers. Butano also has a backpacking site along a trail  up from the entrance. There is no water at the site but there is water nearby from seasonal streams.

Guided nature walk and weekend campfire programs are offered during the summer.

Name
Butano as a name has been applied to land grants, creeks, falls, ridges and forests.  The earliest mention is by Padre Jaime Escudet in 1816.  A butano is what early Californians called a drinking cup made from horn of a bull or other animal.  A Native American origin is possible. It has been suggested that the word might mean “meeting place”.

See also
 List of California state parks

References

External links
Butano State Park

1956 establishments in California
Campgrounds in California
Parks in San Mateo County, California
Protected areas established in 1956
Santa Cruz Mountains
State parks of California